Tropico 4 is a city management and political manipulation game. The game was developed by Haemimont Games and published by Kalypso Media. Like the first and third games in the series, it centers on a customizable main character titled "El Presidente" – the ruler who runs the island banana republic. The Mac OS X version of the game (Tropico 4: Gold Edition, which includes the Modern Times expansion pack) was released by Feral Interactive on July 25, 2013, as well as DLC packs Dash for Growth and Captain of Industry. The State of Emergency DLC pack was released by Feral on April 3, 2014.

For the first time in the series, Tropico 4 includes support for Facebook and Twitter.

Gameplay

The game has 10 preconfigured maps, but the player can make their own island by choosing "Random Island". Upon choosing a random island, a player may customize the size of the island, vegetation, mineral deposits, and elevation, as well as other game parameters. There are various expansion packs which give access to more islands. 

After choosing the island, the player may choose a premade avatar, some based on various Latin American and Caribbean leaders (such as Fidel Castro, Augusto Pinochet, "Papa Doc" Duvalier), or they can create their own avatar. For custom avatars, players may choose: gender, costumes, skin tone, hat, hairstyle, accessories, mustache, beard, earrings, traits, quality, and rise to power. After completing one mission, the character's current traits will level up.

As El Presidente, the player can see in every citizen's needs, happiness, skills, thoughts and political ideology. The demands of Tropicans include food, health, leisure, and faith. These are fulfilled by erecting specific buildings, for example: If the citizens demand leisure the player must try to build a pub, restaurant, movie theater, or some other form of entertainment. Each individual citizen has a unique set of characteristics that influences their motivation, priorities and actions.

A citizen unable to satisfy their needs will become unhappy and may protest peacefully, become a criminal or join the rebels. Individual protesters negatively affect nearby citizens' respect for El Presidente, potentially influencing the next election, though El Presidente may personally calm the protester down. The player loses the game if El Presidente loses an election. As a group, rebels will periodically attack and attempt to destroy buildings. If they destroy the palace, the game is lost. Palace guards and an army are needed to defend against rebel attacks.

There are a variety of factions in Tropico, each influencing the player's strategy. Tropicans join factions in different ways: some will fanatically support one faction, some are less fanatical but remain loyal, some switch sides according to situation, and some do not prefer to join certain factions or any faction at all. Appealing to the factions' needs is crucial to keeping the population under control and avoiding being overthrown, be it by a coup d'état or by losing one of the elections held occasionally. However, some factions' policies and demands conflict with those of others.

Campaign 
The game's campaign consists of 20 missions spread over 10 different maps. They start out with the player character, "El Presidente", having seized control of the island of Tropico.  Imports can be monitored as well as exports (whereas the previous games in the series only allowed for coverage on exports). Tropico 4 includes more superpowers. A council of ministers exists with which the player can consult on a range of different issues. The player will have to deal with natural disasters and the demands of different political factions each with its own ideological outlook.

The game has a variety of humorous elements including running satirical commentary by fictional radio station Tropico News Today, and subtle touches such as liaisons between priests and cabaret girls. The "loading" and "saving" screens have quotes from various leaders, politicians, and revolutionaries such as Che Guevara, Fidel Castro, Vladimir Lenin, Karl Marx, John F. Kennedy, Dwight D. Eisenhower, Augusto Pinochet, Nikita Khrushchev, Leon Trotsky, Mobutu Sese Seko, Todor Zhivkov, Vladimir Putin, Josip Broz Tito, Muammar Gaddafi, Ferdinand Marcos, Imelda Marcos and Mahmoud Ahmadinejad. It, like its predecessors, features a Latin soundtrack drawn mainly from the albums Elementos and Oñejo by Alex Torres and His Orchestra.

Factions 
Capitalists are the wealthy and enterprising people of the island. Naturally, their agenda pits them against the communists. They respect a low crime rate, charging for housing, and having a diverse and competitive economy. They are led by Antonio Lopez, a wealthy opportunist who promotes the sale of dangerous products and even sells firearms to the rebels for a quick buck. If the Capitalists' demands are not being met, they will resort to thievery to make money and will steal a portion of all income, mainly from exports.

Communists are the largest faction. They are concerned about the quality of housing and healthcare on the island. Comrade Vasquez, their leader, is an eccentric who frequently spouts communist slogans. In the event that the Communists become upset, rebels from Cuba will begin to infiltrate your island and fight against your regime.

Intellectuals are more progressive, contrary to the more conservative Religious faction and the Spartan Militarists. They are led by Miss Pineapple, who is also El Presidente's lover and a cabaret dancer. The Intellectuals prefer edicts that benefit the educational sector, and are easily agitated by some others, especially book burning, which will drive them away. Upsetting the Intellectuals will cause student protests, making it so no Tropicans graduate from High Schools or Colleges.

The Religious are a conservative Catholic faction led by Reverend Estaban, a drunkard who uses rum during his sermons to worship God. They are very concerned about faith among Tropicans, and building churches and cathedrals increase their influence. If the Religious faction is upset, priests and bishops will speak against you, spreading dissent among any who attend sermons on the island.

Militarists are interested in the defense of Tropico. They are quite sizeable, and lack of support might result in rebellions, terrorist attacks or invasions. General Rodriguez leads the militarists. The militarists are mostly detractors of the intellectuals, and are thus mostly illiterate. Low wages or overall satisfaction for soldiers may cause the Militarists to stage a coup.

Environmentalists strive to preserve the natural beauty of Tropico. Led by the hippie Sunny Flowers, an anchorwoman and conspiracy theorist, they oppose any efforts to scar the environment, even for economic purposes like logging and mining, and thus are opponents of the Capitalists. Passing anti-pollution laws appeases them. If not appeased, Environmentalists will attempt to blockade your industrial buildings.

Nationalists are in charge of caring for and preserving the Tropican people and their customs. They generally oppose immigrants (especially open-door immigration policies), who, according to leader El Diablo, a violent skinhead, take lucrative jobs away from Tropicans. They will oppose any foreign-friendly policies and are at loggerheads with Communists and Capitalists. When ignored, Nationalists will start riots on the island. These riots quickly escalate into battles between Tropicans and immigrants.

Loyalists are a faction who are always loyal to el Presidente. They are led by El Presidente's personal advisor, Penultimo. Most of their members have below average intelligence and have been brainwashed with all the propaganda beautifying el Presidente. They will never rebel; in return they demand that el Presidente act like a "true leader", shun democracy, and cultivate his image through facilities such as a museum dedicated to el Presidente's childhood. Should they become upset, the Loyalists will begin to lose supporters.

Plot

The game follows the protagonist, El Presidente, as he works towards restoring the power that he lost in the Caribbean after averting a nuclear war perpetrated by the US vice president in order to rise to power. It is divided into three acts:

El Presidente arrives at his new island where he begins his goal to build an ideal nation for his people. To do so, he focuses his administration on several islands, developing the economic potential of each one, until he is ousted from power after being framed for the murder of the current US president. He is then forced to flee his country and heads off to other parts of Tropico.

Forced to take a new identity and flee his republic, El Presidente begins his revenge by establishing a base of power at Isla Oscura. There El Presidente learns that he was victim of a conspiracy involving Keith Preston, the CEO of Fruitas Inc. (a parody of the United Fruit Company), the rebel leader Marco Moreno (a parody of Che Guevara), UN Inspector Brunhilde Van Hoof (a parody of Margaret Thatcher) and his former mentor Generalissimo Santana (a parody of Fidel Castro). After enacting his revenge on the conspirators and clearing his name, El Presidente regains his position as rightful ruler of Tropico.

Reinstated into power, El Presidente focuses on rebuilding his nation, until his former enemies reappear and sell him information about the true mastermind behind his downfall, the US Vice President Nick Richards (a parody of Richard Nixon), who had the US president killed to assume his place. Around this time, perestroika hits the USSR and Tropico offers their assistance to the nation in exchange for evidence incriminating Nick Richards that leads to his demise. El Presidente and his antagonists show parallels to Salvador Allende and his ousting, with El Presidente having socialist policies by default and being overthrown by a dictator backed by both Richard Nixon and Margaret Thatcher stand-ins.

Development
The game was announced in the middle of August 2010 in a press release by publisher Kalypso Media. Tropico 4 was released on both Xbox 360 and PC, as was predecessor Tropico 3. Unlike its predecessors, Tropico 4 was available through the Onlive platform.

Expansion
An expansion, titled Modern Times, was released on March 27, 2012. It features a new single-player 12-mission campaign which takes place a year after the events of Tropico 4. After El Presidente's success in rebuilding Tropico, he leaves on a well deserved vacation, only to find when he returns that his lackey Penultimo has predictably run the entire nation into the ground amid the financial crisis of 2007–2008. While working to put the country back on track, El Presidente crosses paths with the elusive shadow organization "The Conclave", and it's up to him to help save the world again while lining his pockets.

Modern Times also adds a timeline element, where real-world historical events affect gameplay. In addition, new buildings are introduced in accordance to the timeline.

On November 3, 2011, the first of many DLC packs was released, titled Junta Military. Subsequent DLC packs include Plantador, Quick Dry Cement, Pirate Heaven, Megalopolis, Vigilante, Voodoo, Propaganda!, The Academy and Apocalypse. Each DLC pack includes new buildings, a new island, a new mission, a new trait, and, depending on the DLC, new clothing options for El Presidente and new decor.

Demo
A demo version was released on the Xbox Live Marketplace and Steam. It contains 4 tutorial missions and 1 campaign mission. Many buildings are not available for construction.

Reception

The game has received generally positive reviews and holds a 78/100 score on Metacritic based on 46 reviews for the PC version and 77/100 based on 18 reviews for the Xbox 360 version. Certain reviewers praised the game's visuals and attention to detail, while describing it as not particularly challenging. GameSpot commented that "Tropico 4 is a likeable and engaging sequel that expands on its predecessor but doesn't offer much new depth." IGN stated that "if you’re the type that's spent hours with the likes of Civilization or SimCity, or has an unhealthy need to be in control, then it’s time to become El Presidente." Destructoid and Game Informer noted that the game didn't do enough to iterate upon its predecessor, but praised it for being better, with both outlets ultimately recommending the game. Eurogamer wrote that the game didn't address enough of Tropico 3's limitations, stating, "It's hard not to like Tropico 4, because it's based on a solid foundation that is naturally engaging...Its tragedy is that it hasn't bothered to build anything worthwhile on top of that foundation..." GamesRadar+ praised the game for its accessibility and the vast breadth of freedom present, while lamenting its lack of depth.

References

External links

2011 video games
Business simulation games
City-building games
Cold War video games
Feral Interactive games
Games for Windows certified games
Government simulation video games
MacOS games
Single-player video games
Tropico (series)
Video game sequels
Video games developed in Bulgaria
Video games featuring protagonists of selectable gender
Video games set in the Caribbean
Video games set on fictional islands
Video games set on islands
Video games with expansion packs
Windows games
Xbox 360 games